White Tai, or Tai Dón, may be:

Tai Dón people
Tai Dón language